The 2019 Big 12 Conference baseball tournament was held from May 22 through 26 at Chickasaw Bricktown Ballpark in Oklahoma City, Oklahoma.  The annual tournament determined the conference champion of the Division I Big 12 Conference for college baseball.  The winner of the tournament, Oklahoma State, earned the league's automatic bid to the 2019 NCAA Division I baseball tournament.

The tournament has been held since 1997, the inaugural year of the Big 12 Conference.  Among current league members, Texas has won the most championships with five.  Among original members, Kansas State has never won the event.  Baylor won their first championship in 2018.  Iowa State discontinued their program after the 2001 season without having won a title.  Having joined in 2013, TCU won their first title in 2014 while West Virginia has yet to win the Tournament.

Format and seeding
The top eight finishers from the regular season were seeded one through eight, and then played a two-bracket double-elimination tournament leading to a winner-take-all championship game.

Results

Conference championship

All-Tournament Team
Source:

References

Tournament
Big 12 Conference Baseball Tournament
Big 12 Conference baseball tournament
Big 12 Conference baseball tournament
Baseball competitions in Oklahoma City
College sports tournaments in Oklahoma